Benna is a lake in the municipality of Melhus in Trøndelag county, Norway. The lake is the drinking water reservoir for Melhus municipality and a backup supply for the nearby city of Trondheim.

See also
List of lakes in Norway

References

Lakes of Trøndelag
Melhus